Kechi Gerd (also Romanized as Kechī Gerd and Kachī Gerd; also known as Gachī Gerd and Kachigird) is a village in Yalghuz Aghaj Rural District, Serishabad District, Qorveh County, Kurdistan Province, Iran. At the 2006 census, its population was 160, in 40 families. The village is populated by Kurds.

References 

Towns and villages in Qorveh County
Kurdish settlements in Kurdistan Province